Routh is a village and civil parish in the East Riding of Yorkshire, England.

According to the 2001 UK census, Routh parish had a population of 94.

The parish church of All Saints is a Grade II* listed building.

Governance
Routh is represented locally by Tickton and Routh Parish Council a joint council with the adjacent parish of Tickton. while at county level is in the Beverley Rural ward of the East Riding of Yorkshire Council. At a parliamentary level it is part of the Beverley and Holderness constituency which is represented by Graham Stuart of the Conservative Party.

References

External links

Villages in the East Riding of Yorkshire
Civil parishes in the East Riding of Yorkshire